Boas River is also a name for the Çoruh River in northeast Anatolia.
The Boas is a river on Southampton Island in Nunavut, Canada.

It is named after anthropologist Franz Boas.

Flora
There are rich sedge meadows in the river's -wide delta area.

Fauna
Bearded seal, bowhead whale, harbor seal, narwhal, polar bear, ringed seal, walrus, and white whale frequent the area.

Boas River and associated wetlands is a Canadian Important Bird Area, site #NU022. The Harry Gibbons Migratory Bird Sanctuary encompasses one third of the IBA's western portion.

This is a notable breeding area for the lesser snow goose. Other bird species include:
American golden plover, Arctic loon, Atlantic brant, Canada goose, herring gull, jaegers, king eider, Lapland longspur, oldsquaw, red phalarope, red-throated loon, Ross's goose, tundra swan, sandhill crane, semipalmated plover, semipalmated sandpiper, and white-rumped sandpiper.

History
The area was populated by Sadlermiut until the early 20th century when they were wiped out by an epidemic.

See also
List of rivers of Nunavut

References

Rivers of Kivalliq Region
Important Bird Areas of Kivalliq Region